Sierra de Gúdar is a mountain range in the Gúdar-Javalambre and Maestrazgo comarcas of Aragon and the Alto Mijares comarca of the Valencian Community, Spain. The highest point in the range is Peñarroya (2,019 m).

Geography
This mountain range is located at the eastern end of the Iberian System and the Sierra de Nogueruelas is its easternmost prolongation. The Sierra Mayabona is another subrange of the Sierra de Gúdar.
 
Its summits are usually covered in snow in the winter and the 1710 m high Cabezo de las Cruces is one of the highest peaks of the Land of Valencia.

Mora de Rubielos is the most important town in this mountainous zone. 
The range is named after the town of Gúdar. Valdelinares, also a village in the area, is the highest town in Spain among those which are head of a municipality.

See also
List of mountains in Aragon
Mountains of the Valencian Community

References

External links

 Sierra de Gúdar - Monumentos y rutas en Gúdar - Teruel - Turismo 
 Sierra de Gúdar

Gudar
Gudar
Gudar